The boxing events of the 1993 Mediterranean Games were held in Languedoc-Roussillon, France.

Medalists

Medal table

References
1993 Mediterranean Games report at the International Committee of Mediterranean Games (CIJM) website
1993 Mediterranean Games boxing tournament at Amateur Boxing Results

Mediterranean Games
Sports at the 1993 Mediterranean Games
1993